is a 2019 Japanese comedy film directed by Hideki Takeuchi, based on the 1980s manga series of the same name written and illustrated by Mineo Maya. It was released to critical acclaim and received 12 nominations at the 43rd Japan Academy Film Prize, taking home the Director of the Year, Screenplay of the Year, and Best Film Editing. It also won the Best Film at Blue Ribbon Awards. With a gross of $32.8 million it was the 13th highest-grossing film of 2019 in Japan.

Plot

In present-day Saitama, Aimi's parents are driving her to her engagement ceremony. Aimi's parents are upset that Aimi plans to move to Tokyo after the marriage because residents of Tokyo have long looked down on residents of Saitama. To avoid arguing, they pass the time by listening to the radio, which is playing a supposedly historical drama about Saitama's fight for independence from Tokyo. The radio drama unfolds as Momomi, the son of the Tokyo governor, finds his social status at school threatened by the arrival of Rei Asama, a handsome male student who has been living in America. Unusually for a sophisticated Tokyo elite, Asama helps the scholarship students from Saitama, who live in poor conditions in a hut located off the main campus grounds.

Momomi falls in love with Rei, but Rei is revealed to be a secret agent of Saitama sent to help achieve independence from Tokyo by infiltrating the Tokyo elite. Rei's true identity is discovered by Momomi's family butler, and Rei flees to return to Saitama and join the independence movement. Momomi joins him after discovering a plot by Tokyo elites to destroy the Saitama resistance. After Rei finds out the identity of his own father and leads the Saitama forces to a final confrontation with Tokyo forces at the provincial border, Rei and Momomi reveal Momomi's father's plot, removing him from power and achieving independence for Saitama.

Cast

 Fumi Nikaido as Momomi Dannoura
 Gackt as Rei Asami
 Yusuke Iseya as Sho Akutsu
 Masaki Kyomoto as Duke Saitama
 Kumiko Takeda as Aimi's mother
 Haruka Shimazaki as Aimi Sugawara

Box office 

In the opening weekend it topped the Japanese box office with $2.33 million. The film had grossed $32.8 million in Japan by May 2019. By the end of 2019, the film had grossed , making it the eighth highest-grossing domestic film of 2019 in Japan and the 13th highest-grossing film of 2019 overall in Japan.

Critical reception 

It was released to critical acclaim as received most (12) nominations at the 43rd Japan Academy Film Prize, and won for Director of the Year, Screenplay of the Year, and Best Film Editing, as well won for the Best Film at Blue Ribbon Awards.

In a 4⁄5 review in The Japan Times, Mark Schilling praised the film for taking a Japan-specific story and making it appealing to international viewers, and singled out lead actress Nikaido's ability to move between serious and humorous moments in her performance of Momori Dannoura.

References

External links
  at Fuji Television (in English)
  at Pony Canyon International Licensing (in English)
 

2010s high school films
2010s satirical films
2019 films
2019 LGBT-related films
Alternate history manga
Films about adolescence
Films about couples
Films about discrimination
Films set in Chiba Prefecture
Films set in Gunma Prefecture
Films set in Ibaraki Prefecture
Films set in Saitama Prefecture
Films set in Tokyo
Gay-related films
Japanese alternate history films
Japanese high school films
Japanese LGBT-related films
Japanese satirical films
2010s Japanese-language films
LGBT-related coming-of-age films
LGBT-related romantic comedy films
LGBT-related satirical films
Live-action films based on manga
Manga adapted into films
Toei Company films
2010s Japanese films